Count Rutger von Ascheberg (2 June 1621 – 17 April 1693), also known as Roger von Ascheberg was a soldier, officer and civil servant in Swedish service, being appointed Lieutenant General in 1670, General in 1674, Field Marshal in 1678, Governor General of the Scanian provinces, in 1680, and Royal Councilor in 1681.

Biography 
Ascheberg was born on the estate Berbonen (Perbohnen) in Courland (today part of Latvia) on 2 June 1621. He was of an old Westphalian family that had emigrated to Courland in the 16th century. His parents were Wilhelm von Ascheberg and Margaretha von der Osten.

Thirty Years' War 
At the age of 13 he served as page for Colonel Brink of the Swedish army fighting in the Thirty Years' War in Germany. He was present at a number of major battles, including the Battle of Nördlingen in 1634.

In 1639 he left the army for studies in France.  At the age of 19 he was drafted to a Hessian cavalry regiment in Swedish service. He distinguished himself at the Battle of Wolfenbüttel 1641. In the Battle of Breitenfeld in 1642 he was wounded and captured by the enemy, but later rescued. During the remaining part of the Thirty Years' War, Ascheberg fought under Field Marshals Lennart Torstenson and Carl Gustaf Wrangel. He distinguished himself on a number of occasions and was made Cornet in 1644, Captain Lieutenant in 1645 and Rittmeister in 1646.

After the peace was settled in 1648, Ascheberg remained in Germany. He held a position as bailiff 1651–1655. In 1655, he was offered a position as Lieutenant Colonel and command of a regiment within the Swedish army, which prepared for a war against Poland-Lithuania.

Second Northern War (1655–1660) 
The war, known as the Second Northern War, initially took place in Poland-Lithuania. Ascheberg proved to be successful during the campaign. In March 1656. after capturing the city of Jarosław, Ascheberg was promoted Colonel. In July of the same year, he attended the Battle of Warsaw. He commanded the Swedish forces in the Battle of Chojnice (Konitz), in which he was highly successful according to some sources. As a token of his appreciation, Swedish king Charles X Gustav gave von Ascheberg a rapier he had used in battle. von Ascheberg also received valuable jewellery and an estate in Prussia.

Denmark attacked Swedish dominions in Germany in 1657. This meant that the Swedish army, including the forces under Ascheberg's command, left Poland to instead engage their Danish enemy.  In 1658, Ascheberg spearheaded the March across the Belts as the Swedish army marched across the ices of Little Belt and Great Belt in order to reach the Danish island of Zealand.  He narrowly escaped being caught when the enemy under Frederick William of Brandenburg and Polish commander Stefan Czarniecki attacked Sønderborg in December 1658. In February 1659, he was badly wounded during the assault on Copenhagen. After spending 10 weeks abed, a recovered von Ascheberg returned to the battlefield in time to be in charge of the conquest of the island Møn in May 1659. He remained on the island until the war ended in 1660.

Promotions and knighting 
In 1664, Ascheberg was promoted to Major General and in 1665, he took part when Field Marshal Wrangel led Swedish troops to the German city of Bremen during the conflict between Sweden and Bremen. He returned to Sweden when the conflict was settled. In 1670 he reached the rank of Lieutenant General and in 1673, he was declared Freiherr of the estate Kastellgården outside Kungälv. In 1674 he was promoted to General.

Scanian War (1675–1679) 
In the Scanian War, Ascheberg first was responsible for the defence of Bohuslän against attacks from Norway. His force won a battle close to Kviström.  He left Bohuslän for Scania and acted as commander in a number of battles, often alongside king Charles XI. He distinguished himself at the Battle of Halmstad in August 1676, where he was wounded in the arm. After recovering in Gothenburg, he joined the army in Scania in time to play a significant part in the largest battle of the war, the Battle of Lund in December.  He contributed actively to the Swedish victory in the Battle of Landskrona 1677 after which he was appointed Lieutenant Field Marshal. Before the war ended he received highest command of the Swedish army in Scania. In November 1678, after the hostilities had practically ended but before a peace treaty had been negotiated, Ascheberg was handed the highest position within the Swedish army; Field Marshal.

Governor-General and Count 
After the Scanian war had ended, in December 1679, Ascheberg was appointed Governor-General of Gothenburg, Bohuslän and Dalsland. In 1680, Scania and Halland was added to his governorship. He was declared Royal Councillor in 1681 and Count in 1687.

Mentor of the king 
King Charles XI, who rose to the throne as a four-year-old when his father king Charles X Gustav died in 1660, saw Ascheberg as his military master. In a letter to Ascheberg, written 1680, Charles XI acknowledged that "...the little that I have learnt in this war, I have got Herr Field Marshal to thank for, and for as long as I live, I will acknowledge that".

Death 
Ascheberg died in Gothenburg on 17 April 1693. He was buried in German Church (Tyska kyrkan), also known as Kristine Church, Gothenburg, on 26 August 1694. King Charles XI attended the funeral.

Among the manors and estates that Ascheberg owned at the time of his death were Kastellegården, Gullmarsberg, Holma, Torreby, Stenungsön and Ström, in Bohuslän, as well as Sövdeborg, Agerup and Tosterup in Scania.

Marriage and children 
In 1650, Ascheberg married Maria Eleonora von Bussech, member of a noble family from Hessen. She lived 1632–1690 and was buried in 1691, in the same church that Ascheberg would be buried three years later. The couple had the following children:

 George Fredrik von Ascheberg
 Margareta Sabina von Ascheberg
 Ludvig Volrath von Ascheberg
 Anna Elisabeth von Ascheberg
 Karl Gustaf von Ascheberg
 Rutger von Ascheberg
 Gustaf Adolf von Ascheberg
 Kristian Ludvig von Ascheberg
 Eleonora Elisabet von Ascheberg (1663–1737). She was born on 13 September 1663. On 14 September 1679 she married David Makeléer and she died on 13 November 1737.
 Sofia Lovisa von Ascheberg (1664–1720), who married Hans Wachtmeister
 Otto Vilhelm von Ascheberg (1665–1671)
 Margareta von Ascheberg (1671–1753) who married Kjell Kristoffer Barnekow (1663–1700) on 26 January 1691

Legacy 
A major street (Aschebergsgatan) is named in his honor in the city of Gothenburg.

Notes

References

Citations

Sources 
Björlin, Gustaf.: Kriget mot Danmark 1675–1679. Stockholm 1885.
Wahlöö, Claes & Larsson, Göran.: Slaget vid Lund. Lund 1998.

See also 
List of Swedish military commanders
List of Swedish wars
Dominions of Sweden

1621 births
1693 deaths
Field marshals of Sweden
Governors-General of Sweden
Swedish counts
Swedish people of German descent
Members of the Privy Council of Sweden
17th-century Latvian people
Swedish people of the Thirty Years' War
Military personnel of the Thirty Years' War
Second Northern War
17th-century Swedish politicians